Baldev Raj Gupta (also spelled Baladewa Rāja Gupatā; born 8 July 1942, in Chhamal, Sialkot District, British India) is an Indian academic in the field of linguistics, and a Punjabi and Hindi writer.

In addition to his Doctorate in Punjabi linguistics, Gupta  has an MA degree in Sanskrit and Punjabi, and a Post Graduate Diploma in French, Tamil and linguistics. He is also fluent in Urdu and  Dogri. He has taught at Punjabi University, Annamalai University and Jammu University, where he was the head of the Department of Punjabi. He holds positions on the academic boards and advisory committees of several literary and cultural organisations.

Gupta was recipient of award from Central Hindi Directorate for being the author of best book in Hindi by a non-Hindi writer for his book "Bhasha Vigyan - Bhashiki". 
Gupta is a Fellow of the Central Institute of Indian Languages.His book “Research in Indian Linguistics” has been widely acclaimed in research and academic circles, including an award by Jagmohan, then Governor of Jammu and Kashmir.

Publications
Gupta has over a dozen books in Punjabi, Hindi and English to his credit and has won awards for three of his books. His publications include:
Punjabi
 Punjabi Shikshan Kala (1972)
 Sheikh Farid Di Bhasha (1976)
 Bhasha vigyan - Punjabi up-Bhasha Vigyan pakhon (1980)
 Bhasha Vigyan Te Punjabi Bhasha Di Bantar (1981)
 Bhasha Vigyan, Bhasha, Lipi te Lok Sahit (1985)
 Rachana Samparan (1993; short stories)
 Jammu Kashmir Vich Prakashit Panjabi Sahit, Bhashagat Chintan (1991)
 Bhasha sahit te sabhyachar (2002)
Hindi
 Bhasha Vigyan - Vibhinn Khshetra (1978)
 Bhasha Vigyan - Bhashiki (1984)
English

References

20th-century Indian linguists
1942 births
Living people
Academic staff of Annamalai University
Academic staff of Punjabi University